Grizzly Tales for Gruesome Kids is a British animated series based on the generic trademarked book series of the same name by Jamie Rix. After the first four books were published from 1990 to 2001, Carlton Television adapted the short stories into ten-minute cartoons for ITV, produced by themselves, Honeycomb Productions, and Rix's production company, Elephant Productions, as well as Grizzly TV. It aired on CITV between January 2000 and October 2007 with six series and 78 episodes, as well as a New Year's Eve special that was over 20 minutes longer than other episodes. The series returned in a new format for NickToons UK with 26 episodes split into two series under the name Grizzly Tales (also known as Grizzly Tales: Cautionary Tales for Lovers of Squeam!), which aired between May 2011 and November 2012.

Both versions of the series have been nominated for BAFTAs and the CITV series has received numerous international awards from animated film festivals. Both have been popular on their respective channels; the CITV series has often been re-aired on Nickelodeon with the Nicktoons series. The CITV cartoon was available for purchase on DVD in the UK and Northern Ireland, as well as Porchlight Entertainment in North America and Time Life's Shock Records in Australia and New Zealand. The Nickelodeon cartoon was later released on DVD through the same respective companies, however, it was released in the UK and Northern Ireland with Abbey Home Media.

Series overview
The following dates included are borrowed from the TV Episode Calendar, Newspapers.com, and the official Grizzly Tales/Honeycomb Productions website.

Series 1 (2000)
All episodes were produced in 1998 and 1999.

Series 2 (2001)
All episodes were produced in 1998 and 1999.

Series 3 (2002)
Despite the second half being aired in 2003, all episodes were produced in 2002.

Series 4 (2004)
Despite being first aired in 2004, the original 14 episodes were produced in 2002.

Series 5 (2006)

Series 6 (2006)

Series 7 (2011)
All 13 episodes were produced in 2010.

Series 8 (2011-2012)
Despite the episodes being aired in 2011 and 2012, all 13 episodes were produced in 2010.

References

Notes

Citations

External links

Lists of British children's television series episodes
Lists of British animated television series episodes
Grizzly Tales for Gruesome Kids